Only Murders in the Building is an American mystery comedy-drama television series created by Steve Martin and John Hoffman. The ten-episode first season premiered on Hulu in August 2021. The plot follows three strangers played by Steve Martin, Martin Short, and Selena Gomez, with a shared interest in true crime podcasts who join to investigate a death in the apartment building they all live in. The series has received critical acclaim for its comedic approach to crime fiction, as well as the performances and chemistry among the lead performers.
 
In the first season, after a suspicious death in their affluent Upper West Side apartment building, the three neighbors start their own podcast about their investigation. In the second season, which premiered in June 2022, the trio themselves become suspects in the bloody murder of another building resident. The series has received numerous accolades, including nominations for the Primetime Emmy Award for Outstanding Comedy Series and for the Primetime Emmy Award for Outstanding Lead Actor in a Comedy Series for Martin and Short. In July 2022, the series was renewed for a third season.

Cast and characters

Main

 Steve Martin as Charles-Haden Savage, a semi-retired actor who was the star of a popular 1990s crime drama, Brazzos
 Martin Short as Oliver Putnam, an ambitious but financially struggling Broadway director who spawns the idea of the podcast and becomes its director
 Selena Gomez as Mabel Mora, a young artist who is living alone in her aunt's unit and who was friends with the first season's murder victim, Tim Kono, through her childhood and teenage years
 Madeleine Valencia (season 1) and Caroline Valencia (season 2) portray young Mabel
 Aaron Dominguez as Oscar Torres (season 1), a friend of Mabel and Tim who was wrongly convicted of the murder of their friend Zoe ten years earlier and has been recently released from prison
 Amy Ryan as Jan Bellows (season 1; recurring season 2), a professional bassoonist who begins dating Charles
 Cara Delevingne as Alice Banks (season 2), an artist who Mabel begins dating

Recurring

 Vanessa Aspillaga as Ursula, the Arconia's building manager
 Julian Cihi as Tim Kono (season 1), a resident of the Arconia who dies in the first episode. The mysterious circumstances surrounding his death spur Charles, Oliver, and Mabel to do their own investigation.
 Tina Fey as Cinda Canning, the host of the true crime podcast All Is Not OK in Oklahoma, a parody of Serial
 Adina Verson as Poppy White/Becky Butler, Cinda's ambitious but abused assistant
 Ryan Broussard as Will Putnam, Oliver's son
 Maulik Pancholy as Arnav (season 1), Charles' next-door neighbor
 Jackie Hoffman as Uma Heller, an ornery Arconia resident
 Jayne Houdyshell as Bunny Folger, the iron-fisted board president of the Arconia whose murder is investigated in Season 2
 Houdyshell also voices Mrs. Gambolini (season 2), Bunny's pet parrot
 Da'Vine Joy Randolph as Detective Williams, a detective on the Kono murder who initially closed the case but becomes interested again after her wife starts listening to the podcast
 Nathan Lane as Teddy Dimas, an old friend and patron of Oliver's family who has ties to organized crime, and who agrees to sponsor the podcast
 James Caverly as Theo Dimas, Teddy Dimas's son
 Michael Cyril Creighton as Howard Morris, a cat-loving resident of the Arconia, whose cat died the same night as Tim Kono
 Zainab Jah as Ndidi Idoko (season 1), Tim Kono's next-door neighbor
 Russell G. Jones as Dr. Grover Stanley, a therapist who lives at the Arconia
 Jaboukie Young-White as Sam, Daniel Oreskes as Marv, Ali Stroker as Paulette, and Orson Hong as Grant, enthusiastic fans of the Only Murders in the Building podcast
 Olivia Reis as Zoe Cassidy (season 1), a friend of Mabel, Tim, and Oscar who died ten years earlier after falling from the roof of the Arconia
 Teddy Coluca as Lester, the doorman at the Arconia
 Zoe Colletti as Lucy (season 2), the teenage daughter of Charles' ex-girlfriend, with whom Charles has a tenuous father-daughter relationship
 Michael Rapaport as Detective Kreps (season 2), a police detective investigating Bunny's murder
 Christine Ko as Nina Lin (season 2), Bunny's protégé and the Arconia's new board president
 Ariel Shafir as Ivan (season 2), a server at Bunny's regular diner
 Paul Rudd as Ben Glenroy (season 3; guest season 2), a theater actor who dies while performing on stage

Guest
 Adriane Lenox as Roberta, Oliver's ex-wife
 Sting as a fictionalized version of himself (season 1), an Arconia resident
 Roy Wood Jr. and Jacob Ming-Trent as Vaughn and Lucian (season 1), hosts of a horticulture podcast who give Charles and Oliver a ride
 Jimmy Fallon as himself (season 1)
 Mandy Gonzalez as Silvia Mora, Mabel's mother (season 1)
 Jane Lynch as Sazz Pataki, Charles' stunt double
 Amy Schumer as a fictionalized version of herself (season 2). She moves into Sting's former apartment and proposes a TV series to Oliver based on their podcast.
 Ben Livingston as Charles' late father (season 2)
 Shirley MacLaine as Rose Cooper (season 2), Charles' father's lover and painter, who pretended to be Bunny's mother, Leonora Folger.
 Andrea Martin as Joy (season 2), Charles' longtime makeup artist and love interest
 Mark Consuelos as Mabel's late father (season 2)
 Jason Veasey as Jonathan, Howard's neighbor and love interest (season 2)

Episodes

Season 1 (2021)

Season 2 (2022)

Production

Development
In January 2020, it was announced that Steve Martin and Martin Short would star in an untitled Hulu series, created by Martin and John Hoffman, with Martin, Short, and Hoffman as executive producers, alongside Dan Fogelman, with 20th Television serving as the studio. On September 14, 2021, Hulu renewed the series for a second season. On July 11, 2022, the series was renewed for a third season.

Casting
Alongside the initial announcement, it was announced Martin and Short would star in the series. In August 2020, Selena Gomez joined the cast and also serves as an executive producer. In November 2020, Aaron Dominguez joined the cast in a series regular role. In January 2021, Amy Ryan joined the cast in a series regular role and Nathan Lane joined the cast in a recurring role. On December 1, 2021, it was reported that Cara Delevingne joined the cast as a series regular for the second season. On January 12, 2022, Short announced that Shirley MacLaine and Amy Schumer were cast to guest star for the second season. On February 11, 2022, Michael Rapaport joined the cast in a recurring role for the second season. On October 25, 2022, Jesse Williams was cast in a recurring capacity for the third season. On January 17, 2023, Meryl Streep was cast in an undisclosed capacity for the third season. On February 23, 2023, Ashley Park joined the cast in a recurring role for the third season.

Filming
Principal photography for the first season began on December 3, 2020, in New York City, and concluded in April 2021. The Belnord was used for exterior shots of the Arconia. Filming of the second season began on December 1, 2021. Filming for the third season began in January 2023.

Music
A digital album for the score was released on August 27, 2021, four days before the series' debut. On July 15, 2022, the original song that was played briefly in the season 2 episode "Here's Looking at You", "Angel in Flip-Flops", was released online. It was performed by Steve Martin as his character Charles-Haden Savage and written by Martin and Kirker Butler, with Paul Shaffer as producer. An album for season 2 was released on August 12, 2022.

Release
Only Murders in the Building premiered on August 31, 2021, on Hulu. Internationally, the series premiered on the same day on Disney+ under the dedicated streaming hub Star, as an original series, and on Star+ in Latin America. Disney+ Hotstar released the series in select territories on September 3, 2021. On Disney+, Disney+ Hotstar, and Star+, Only Murders in the Building episodes were scheduled to debut on a weekly basis. The second season premiered on June 28, 2022.

Reception

Audience viewership
On September 3, 2021, it was reported that Only Murders in the Building set a record for the most-watched comedy premiere in Hulu history. On October 28, 2021, Hulu Originals president Craig Erwich said in an interview with Vulture that the show had become the most-watched comedy ever on Hulu "by a good measure." In the same article, Vulture reported that, according to Parrot Analytics, the show went from having about 16 times the audience demand in the U.S. as an average show when it debuted on August 31 to generating 37 times typical demand by the time the season 1 finale dropped on October 19. This meant that the day after the finale the show ranked as high as 14th on the list of most in-demand shows in the U.S. and signaled a "massive" 135% growth rate that according to Erwich is mainly attributable to word of mouth. According to the streaming aggregator JustWatch, Only Murders in the Building was the most-streamed TV series across all U.S. platforms during the week ending October 24, 2021, and second during the week ending October 31, 2021.

According to Parrot Analytics, which looks at consumer engagement in consumer research, streaming, downloads, and on social media, Only Murders in the Building was the third-most in-demand streaming original series in the U.S. during the week of August 13 to 19, 2022, as well as during the week of August 20 to 26. According to Whip Media, it was the most-streamed TV series across all U.S. platforms during the week ending August 7, 2022, and during the week of August 28. According to the streaming aggregator JustWatch, it was the third-most streamed TV series across all U.S. platforms during the week ending July 3, 2022.

Critical response

For the first season, review aggregator website Rotten Tomatoes reported a 100% approval rating with an average rating of 8/10, based on 105 critic reviews. The website's critics consensus reads, "Only Murders in the Buildings silly approach to true crime obsessives is at once hilarious and insightful, thanks in large part to its extremely charming central trio." Metacritic gave the first season a weighted average score of 76 out of 100 based on 34 critic reviews, indicating "generally favorable reviews".

Kristen Baldwin of Entertainment Weekly gave the first season a "B" grade and wrote, "Only Murders delivers above-average laughs, a clever mystery, and a starry cast. But it's hard to shake the feeling that the show missed an opportunity to be something special." Reviewing for Rolling Stone, Alan Sepinwall gave a rating of four and a half out of five stars and said, "The series soon turns out to belike The Princess Bride, Galaxy Quest, or Jane the Virginthat rare and wonderful thing: the parody that also offers a great example of the genuine article."

For the second season, Rotten Tomatoes reported a 98% approval rating with an average rating of 8.05/10, based on 112 critic reviews. The website's critics consensus states, "Only Murders in the Building gets a new lease on life with a knottier sophomore outing that retains the series' core charm and wit." Metacritic gave the second season a weighted average score of 79 out of 100 based on 25 critic reviews, indicating "generally favorable reviews".

Accolades

The seventh episode of the first season was given the Seal of Authentic Representation from the Ruderman Family Foundation for the portrayal of Theo by James Caverly, as an actor with a disability and at least five lines of dialogue. The first season was recognized with The ReFrame Stamp for hiring people of underrepresented gender identities, and of color.

Notes

References

External links
 
 
 Official pilot screenplay

Only Murders in the Building
2020s American comedy-drama television series
2020s American mystery television series
2020s American LGBT-related comedy television series
2020s American LGBT-related drama television series
2021 American television series debuts
Bisexuality-related television series
English-language television shows
Hulu original programming
Primetime Emmy Award-winning television series
Television series created by Steve Martin
Television series by 20th Century Fox Television
Murder in television
Television shows filmed in New York City
Television shows set in Manhattan